Marana Simhasanam is a 1999 Indian Malayalam-language drama film written and directed by Murali Nair. Inspired by the first execution by electrocution in India, the film was screened in the Un Certain Regard section at the 1999 Cannes Film Festival where it won the Caméra d'Or. The film received special reception at the British Film Institute. The film received positive reviews from Le Monde for its unusual theme. The film was screened in Vienna, Torino, Toronto, Pusan, La Rochelle, Midnight Sun Film Festival Lapland, and the American Film Institute's Film Festival.

Plot
Krishnan is an out-of-work seasonal farmer who is driven to steal coconuts from his landlord to support his family. When he is caught and imprisoned, he is shocked to learn that he has been charged with the murder of a man who has been missing from the island for many years. But since it was an election time, and the most popular platform for politicians had become capital punishment, Krishnan is sentenced to death in the country's newest technology - electrocution by electric chair funded by the World bank. He is promised a statue being erected in his honour.

Cast
 Vishwas Njavakkal
 Lakshmi Raman
 Suhas Thayat
 Jeevan Mitva

Production
The film was shot entirely by amateur team on location near the Manjanikkadu islet in Vypin, a small island off the coast of Njarakkal in Kerala, India. Except the female lead, all characters were portrayed by the locals in the village, including a widowed basket weaver who responded to a casting advertisement in the Malayalam daily Mathrubhoomi.

Accolades

References

External links
 

1999 films
1999 drama films
Films about discrimination
Films about prejudice
Films about abuse
Caméra d'Or winners
Films about capital punishment
Indian drama films
Films about death
Works about law enforcement
Fictional portrayals of the Kerala Police
Films shot in Kochi
Films about social issues in India
Films about poverty in India
1990s Malayalam-language films
Films directed by Murali Nair
Films about corruption in India